The University High School (abbreviated as UHS or Uni High) is a government-funded co-educational secondary day school, located in the Melbourne suburb of Parkville, Victoria, Australia. , 1,425 students attended the school.

History
In 1910, the "University Practising School" was opened in a former primary school on the corner of Lygon and Lytton Streets, Carlton. In 1913, it changed its name to "The University High School" after the closure of the older private school. Since 1930, the school has occupied a site in Story Street, Parkville, adjacent to the Royal Melbourne Hospital and in close proximity to the Royal Children's Hospital, newly built Royal Women's Hospital, the University of Melbourne and the Central Business District.

During World War II, the United States Army set up a camp on the school oval. Additionally, 240 extra students from MacRobertson Girls High School transported to UHS for schooling as their buildings were also seized by the military.

The school has been a pioneer in the education of gifted and talented students in Australia. Its acceleration program for gifted students, which began in 1981, is the longest running and most stable program of its kind in Australia.

An A$8 million upgrade of the school facilities was completed in 1997. The school experienced major disruption and change during the previous years through dislocation of classes and staff. The completion of the works has given the school modern facilities with appropriate specialist rooms.

During the 2020/21 school holidays, an electrical fire consumed much of the south building, destroying the second (600s) and third (700s) floors of the building as well as damaging the first (Library, 500s) and fourth (VCE Center) floors. The VCE Center, 600s rooms and the library reopened at the beginning of the last quarter of the year with a new refurbished design whilst the third floor (700s) are yet to reopen.

Academics
VCE studies offered by the school:
Accounting, Algorithmics (HESS) (2022), Australian and Global Politics, Australian Politics, Biology, Business Management, Chemistry, Economics, English, English (EAL), English Language Extended Investigation, French, Further Mathematics, General Mathematics, German, Global Politics, Health and Human Development, History: 20th Century (1900–1945), History: 20th Century (since 1945), History: Revolutions, Information Technology, Latin, Legal Studies, Literature, Mathematical Methods (CAS), Media, Music Performance, Outdoor and Environmental Studies, Philosophy, Physical Education, Physics, Product Design and Technology, Psychology, Specialist Mathematics, Studio Arts and Visual Communication Design.

The University High School was ranked in the top 200 public secondary schools in Australia based on academic results in 2009.

In 2014, 17 students scored an Australian Tertiary Admission Rank above 99 and 130 students, or 61 per cent of the year, scored above 80.

University High School was ranked number 70 out of all state secondary schools in Victoria based on VCE results in 2021.

House structure
The school has four different houses also known as sub-schools. They each have their own distinct colour and is named after some of the school's alumni. They are:
Coleman (green) - named after Australian footballer John Coleman
Gulam (red) - named after academic, Hyder Gulam
Johnston (blue) - named after the Dean of Science of the University of New South Wales and president of Science & Technology Australia, Emma Johnston
Triggs (yellow) - named after public international law specialist and former president of the Australian Human Rights Commission, Gillian Triggs

Campus 
The University High School is divided into eleven buildings/divisions: West, North, South, Art/Tech, Music, Hall, Canteen/Gymnasium, EBS, GTAC and the portables.

The North Building was constructed in 1930 during the Great Depression. Because of this, no additional facilities were constructed and therefore assemblies were held in other venues. The North Building is connected with the West and Music wings. The north building has three levels, and contains the rooms numbered 100 through 405. The first floor (100s) holds the main entrance to the school as well as most administrative facilities. Inside the main foyer one can see a collection of photographs commemorating pupils and teachers from the school who were killed in the First World War. Also many plaques are hanging from the walls that honour achievements made by students and state principals and other important administrative roles. There are many banners that show sports achievements, as well as sub-school names that recognise past principals. The 100s also contain the English Office, General Office, Performance Center, food technology classrooms, general classrooms and the student services counter. Minor renovations were made to the bottom floor of the North Building to construct a food technology classroom and kitchen. The second floor (200s) consists of the junior science laboratories, well-being rooms, the Science Office, the Well-being Office and the sub-school offices. The third floor (300s) contains the Maths Office, the LOTE Office, the computer classrooms, mathematics classrooms, LOTE classrooms and English classrooms. The 400s are part of an extension of the third floor and consists of EAL classrooms which are converted into praying rooms during specific times.

The West Wing is the smallest of the buildings, but is conjoined with the Music Wing. The west wing features many lockers, mainly for the younger students (Year 7–8) as well as English/Humanities classrooms. The Music Wing was developed, planned, constructed and funded by ex-students and ex-teachers, including Stella Langford and Jim Economo. The Music Wing consists of music classrooms, composition classrooms, practice rooms and the Music Office. Rooms in the West and Music wings are numbered as part of the 100s and 200s as they are connected to the North Building. A series of building works were undertook from 2010 to 2014. In 2011, the West Wing was gutted and the interior was completely rebuilt, allowing for more classroom spaces.

The Sharman Hall serves as the school's hall. The hall is used for school assemblies and performances. The Sharman Hall is attached to the Canteen/Gymnasium building. The canteen floor has the school canteen as well as indoor seatings and lockers. Rooms located within the canteen are numbered as part of the 100s. Above the canteen is the school gymnasium which holds the Sports Office. An extension of the canteen was completed in the last quarter of 2006 which connected it with the M.S. Sharman Hall.

The South Building is the next largest building containing the Library and VCE Centre. The building consists of four levels with rooms numbered from 500 through 724 and VCE1 through VCE5. The first floor (500s) contain the library as well as lockers. The second floor (600s) contain the Humanities Office as well as humanities  classrooms. The third floor (700s) contains the senior science laboratories, general classrooms and lockers. In late 2009 the school unveiled a new bridge linking the North and South Buildings from the west-end of the 700s corridor (South Building) to the centre of the 300s corridor (North Building). Currently the third level (700s rooms) are temporarily closed due to fire damage sustained during the 2020/21 school holidays. A fourth level extension to the South Wing was completed early in 2007 and was named the VCE Centre. The extension was made for VCE students. It has classrooms specifically for VCE students and the VCE Sub-school Offices are located in the centre.

The Gene Technology Access Centre (GTAC) was opened for use in early 2004 by staff and students from across the state. This allows students from throughout Victoria to have direct exposure to cutting edge research in the genetics field. The GTAC building consists of science and research laboratories as well as the school's Fitness Center on the first floor.  

The Art/Tech Building is primarily used for Art and technology subjects as well as general classes. It is the third largest of the four buildings and has three levels with roomed numbers from 800 through 909. The first floor (800s) contain the visual arts classrooms, woodwork classrooms and the Arts and Technology Office. The second and third floors (900s) contain more woodwork classrooms as well as sewing rooms and the Careers Office. Lockers are also located within the 800s and 900s. A dedicated art classroom for VCE students was also constructed, above the existing 900s. 

In conjunction with the University of Melbourne, a new dedicated academically selective science subschool/program was created for students in year 11 and 12, on space previously occupied by the University's Veterinary Science buildings. It is called Elizabeth Blackburn Sciences (EBS), named after a former student of University High School. Rooms in EBS are numbered from EB10 to EB24. The first floor (EB10s) consist of a lecture room (EB10), EBS Office, the main science laboratory and lockers. The second floor (EB20s) consist of general classrooms, another lecture room (EB20) as well as outdoor spaces and lockers. Prospective students looking to enrol in Elizabeth Blackburn Sciences must sit an entrance exam testing their knowledge in literacy, numeracy and science.

In 2021, portable classrooms were added to increase the school's capacity after the temporary closures of the South Building and the rising enrolment numbers. The portables are numbered from rooms 1001 through 1012.

List of  principals

Notable alumni

In 2001, University High was ranked tenth in Australia's top ten schools for the education of girls based on the number of female alumni in the Who's Who in Australia.

Academic
 Elizabeth Blackburn , 2009 Nobel Prize Laureate in Physiology or Medicine
 Suzanne Cory , medical biology
 Norman Greenwood
 Emma Johnston , marine ecology
 Richard Charles Mills, economics
 James Mahmud Rice, sociology, winner of the 2009 Stein Rokkan Prize for Comparative Social Science Research
 Ken Simpson, ornithologist
 A. T. S. Sissons, pharmaceutical science
 Terry Speed, statistics
 Louis Waller , law

Business and government
 Alfred Oscar Lawrence, chairman of the Forests Commission Victoria 1956-1969
 Richard Pratt, businessman and philanthropist

Media, entertainment and the arts
 Matt Day, actor and filmmaker 
 Peter Faiman , producer and director
 Dan Falzon, actor ("Neighbours")
 Patricia Karvelas, journalist
 Wendy Law Suart, traveller and writer
 Sam Lipski , journalist
 Graeme Lyall , musician
 Leslie P. Newman , former president of Comdance 
 Dame Olivia Newton-John , actor and singer
 Bruce Pascoe, writer
 Andreja Pejic, model
 Ruby Rose, MTV VJ and television presenter
 Lucien Savron, theatre and film director
 Noah Taylor, actor
 D. M. Thomas, Cornish writer shortlisted for the 1981 Booker Prize attended between 1949 and 1951 while living in Melbourne
 Judah Waten , author
 David Williamson , playwright
 Catherine Deveny Comedy writer, stand-up comedian and columnist for the Age

Military
 Rupert Balfe, killed at Gallipoli on 25 April 1915, doctor, footballer, athlete
 Maurice Fergusson , Australian army officer during World War I and World War II
 Clifford William King Sadlier , winner of the Victoria Cross

Politics and the law
 Neil Brown , former federal minister
 Robert Clark , parliamentarian and former Victorian Minister
 Julie Dodds-Streeton , judge of the Supreme Court of Victoria and Federal Court of Australia.
 Betty King, Victorian Supreme Court judge
 Joan Kirner , first female Premier of Victoria
 John So , former Lord Mayor of Melbourne
 Leonard Edward Bishop Stretton, notable judge and royal commissioner in the State of Victoria
 Gillian Triggs, former president of the Australian Human Rights Commission 
 Ralph Willis, former Australian Federal Treasurer

Sport

 Allen Aylett, former chairman of the VFL/AFL and North Melbourne F.C., All Australian, North Melbourne Best & Fairest, cricketer
 Rupert Balfe, AFL footballer (University FC), also Military (killed in Gallipoli on the landing)
 Neil Balme, former Richmond AFL Footballer, premiership player in 1973 & 1974, Coached Melbourne FC, Football Administrator at Collingwood, Geelong and Richmond. 
 George Bazeley, Australian hockey player
 Fraser Brown, AFL footballer (Carlton) 1995 Premiership player for Carlton FC and son of Joyce Brown (Australian Netballer and Coach)
 John Coleman, AFL Legend
 Brent Crosswell, AFL footballer (Carlton, Nth Melbourne and Melbourne), a freakishly talented and charismatic footballer (4 times premiership player, Carlton 1968 & 1970 and Nth Melbourne 1975 & 1977), cousin of Craig Davis (Carlton, Nth Melbourne, Collingwood & Sydney Swans).
 Ellvana Curo, Albanian-Australian soccer player
 Owen Davidson, International Tennis Hall of Fame
 Alan Gale, Fitzroy FC, Team of the Century
 Adrian Gallagher, Carlton F.C. Team of the Century, Carlton Best and Fairest, cricketer
 David Glascott, Carlton FC Triple premiership player, also premiership player for Carlton Reserves, U/19's and Night Premiership
 Stuart Glascott, Brisbane Bears AFL footballer (Carlton reserves player and younger brother of David Glascott)
 Corey Jones, North Melbourne FC AFL footballer
 Bob Keddie, Hawthorn FC Best and Fairest, All Australian
 Pam Kilborn, Olympic medallist
 Col Kinnear, AFL Coach (Sydney Swans), also coached premierships at Carlton FC Reserves and Coburg (VFA)
 Michael Klim, Olympic medallist
 Barry McAuliffe, AFL footballer (Nth Melbourne)
 Georgia Nanscawen, Australian hockey player
 Robert Peterson, AFL footballer (Nth Melbourne)
 Phillip Pinnell, AFL footballer (Carlton & Melbourne). 1970 Carlton premiership player, inaugural coach for Springvale in the VFA
 Jasper Pittard, AFL footballer
 Brady Rawlings, former North Melbourne AFL Footballer
 Ian Robinson, AFL umpire, Australian Football Hall of Fame
 Terry Rodgers, AFL footballer (Essendon)
 John Scholes, AFL footballer (Nth Melbourne), Carlton CC & Victorian State Cricketer 
 Sedat Sir, former Western Bulldogs AFL footballer
 Shannon Watt, former North Melbourne AFL footballer
 Ron Wearmouth, AFL footballer (Collingwood), son of Footscray player Dick Wearmouth 
 Keith Wiegard, Fitzroy footballer, Fitzroy FC CEO / president, 1960 Rome Olympian, water polo

See also

 List of high schools in Victoria

References

Notes
 Who's Who of girls' school rankings: 1.PLC Melbourne, 2.SCEGGS Darlinghurst, 3.MLC Melbourne, 4.PLC Sydney, 5.Melbourne Girls Grammar School, 6.Mac.Robertson Girls' High School, 7.North Sydney Girls High School, 8.Sydney Girls High School, 9.MLC Sydney, 10. University High School

Further reading

External links
Official website

Public high schools in Melbourne
Educational institutions established in 1910
Heritage-listed buildings in Melbourne
1910 establishments in Australia
Buildings and structures in the City of Melbourne (LGA)